The Women of Wrestling (WOW) is an American women's professional wrestling promotion. WOW personnel consists of professional wrestlers, commentators, ring announcers and various other positions. Executive officers are also listed.

Roster

Wrestlers

Other on-air personnel

Broadcast team 
The following section pertains to announcers who cover WOW broadcasts. This group includes presenters, ringside commentators, ring announcers and backstage interviewers.

Creative team

References

External links 
 Official WOW website
 Official WOW YouTube channel
 Official WOW Facebook page

Women of Wrestling personnel